Daphnella varicosa is a species of sea snail, a marine gastropod mollusk in the family Raphitomidae.

The variety Daphnella varicosa var. subrissoides Hervier, 1897 is a synonym of Tritonoturris subrissoides (Hervier, 1897) (basionym)

Description
The length of the shell varies between 8 mm and 16 mm.

The shell is finely reticulated by growth and revolving striae, with larger spiral lirae, crossed by non-continuous varices. The color of the shell is yellowish white, with minute white markings on the spiral ridges, and a large brown spot on the back of the body whorl apparent also within the aperture.

Distribution
This marine species occurs off Taiwan, the Loyalty Islands, New Caledonia and Hawaii

References

 Liu J.Y. [Ruiyu] (ed.)(2008). Checklist of marine biota of China seas. China Science Press. 1267 pp.

External links
 
 Gastropods.com: Daphnella varicosa

varicosa
Gastropods described in 1874